Apagomerina subtilis is a species of beetle in the family Cerambycidae. It was described by Martins and Galileo in 1996. It is known from Brazil.

References

subtilis
Beetles described in 1996